Daviesia sarissa is a species of flowering plant in the family Fabaceae and is endemic to inland areas of south-western Western Australia. It is a spreading or sprawling, glaucous shrub with scattered, long, rigid, cylindrical, sharply-pointed phyllodes, and orange-yellow and red flowers.

Description

Taxonomy
Daviesia sarissa was first formally described in 1995 by Michael Crisp in Australian Systematic Botany from specimens he collected near Lake Chidnup, north-west of Ravensthorpe in 1975. The specific epithet (sarissa) is a word meaning a long Macedonian lance, referring to the leaves.

In the same paper, Crisp described two subspecies of D. sarissa and the names are accepted by the Australian Plant Census:
 Daviesia sarissa subsp. redacta Crisp;
 Daviesia sarissa Crisp subsp. sarissa Crisp differs from subsp. redacta in having bracts that do not overlap or hide the inflorescence, but are long, the flowers usually smaller.

Distribution and habitat
This daviesia grows in heath. Subspecies redacta occurs between Southern Cross and Coolgardie in the Coolgardie biogeographic region, and subp. sarissa between Pingaring, Newdegate and near Lake King in the Esperance Plains and Mallee bioregions of south-western Western Australia.

Conservation status 
Daviesia sarissa is listed as "not threatened" by the Government of Western Australia Department of Biodiversity, Conservation and Attractions, but subspecies redacta is classified as "Priority Two", meaning that it is poorly known and from only one or a few locations.

References 

sarissa
Taxa named by Michael Crisp
Plants described in 1995
Flora of Western Australia